Express 3 is a high speed catamaran built by Incat for Molslinjen.

History
In October 2015, Molslinjen placed an order with Incat for the KatExpress 3. She was delivered with the name Express 3 in April 2017.

Design
Her design is based on an earlier  Incat specification of which Molslinjen operates two examples, but modified for lower fuel consumption and improved vehicle deck efficiency. She can carry 1,000 passengers and up to 411 cars, or up to 227 cars when her 610 lane meter freight deck is occupied by commercial vehicles.

References

External links
 Video of sea trials in Tasmania

Incat high-speed craft
Ships built by Incat
2017 ships